The persecution of Copts  and the discrimination against Coptic Orthodox Christians are historic and widespread issues in Egypt. They are also prominent examples of the poor status of Christians in the Middle East despite the fact that the religion is native to the Middle East, and its practices are old in the country dating back to the Roman Era. Copts (Coptic:  ou Remenkīmi en.E khristianos, literally: "Egyptian Christian") are the Christ followers in Egypt, usually Oriental Orthodox, who currently make up 15% of the population of Egypt—the largest religious minority of that country. Copts have cited instances of persecution throughout their history and Human Rights Watch has noted "growing religious intolerance" and sectarian violence against Coptic Christians in recent years, as well as a failure by the Egyptian government to effectively investigate properly and prosecute those responsible. Since 2011 hundreds of Egyptian Copts have been killed in sectarian clashes, and many homes, churches and businesses have been destroyed. In just one province (Minya), 77 cases of sectarian attacks on Copts between 2011 and 2016 have been documented by the Egyptian Initiative for Personal Rights. The abduction and disappearance of Coptic Christian women and girls also remains a serious ongoing problem.

Ancient era

Roman rulers
St. Mark the Evangelist is said to have founded the Holy Apostolic See of Alexandria and to have become its first Patriarch. Within 50 years of St. Mark's arrival in Alexandria, a fragment of New Testament writings appeared in Oxyrhynchus (Bahnasa), which suggests that Christianity already began to spread south of Alexandria at an early date. By the mid-third century, a sizable number of Egyptians were persecuted by the Romans on account of having adopted the new Christian faith, beginning with the Edict of Decius. Beginning in 284 AD the Emperor Diocletian persecuted and put to death a great number of Christian Egyptians. This event became a bloodshed in the history of Egyptian Christianity, marking the beginning of a distinct Egyptian or Coptic Church. It became known as the 'Era of Martyrs' and is commemorated in the Coptic calendar in which dating of the years began with the start of Diocletian's reign. When Egyptians were persecuted by Diocletian, many retreated to the desert to seek relief, though relief of the spirit and of its worldly desires to attain peace and unity with Christ the Creator, not escaping the persecutions. The practice precipitated the rise of monasticism, for which the Egyptians, namely St. Antony, St. Bakhum, St. Shenouda and St. Amun, are credited as pioneers. By the end of the 4th century, it is estimated that the mass of the Egyptians had either embraced Christianity or were nominally Christian.

In 451 AD, following the Council of Chalcedon, the Church of Alexandria was divided into two branches. Those who accepted the terms of the Council became known as Chalcedonians or Melkites. Those who did not abide by the council's terms were labeled non-Chalcedonians or Monophysites (and later Jacobites after Jacob Baradaeus). The non-Chalcedonians, however, rejected the term Monophysites as erroneous and insisted on being called Miaphysites. The majority of the Egyptians belonged to the Miaphysite branch, which led to their persecution by the Byzantine imperial authorities in Egypt. First persecutions occurred  during reigns of emperors Marcian (450–457) and Leo I (457–474). This continued until the Arab conquest of Egypt, most notably under the militant monotheletist Cyrus of Alexandria. Tragic conflicts between Eastern-Orthodox Greeks and Oriental-Orthodox Copts during that era, from the middle of 5th to the middle of 7th century, resulted in permanent divisions and consequent emergence of anti-Eastern Orthodox sentiment among Copts and anti-Oriental Orthodox sentiment among Greeks.

Islamic era

The Muslim conquest of Egypt

The Muslim conquest of Egypt took place in 639 AD, during the rule of the Roman Emperor Heraclius. The Muslims relegated Copts to the status of dhimmi and enforced the Pact of Umar. Its points were as follows:
 Prohibition against building new churches, places of worship, monasteries, monks or a new cell. (Hence it was also forbidden to build new synagogues. It is known that new synagogues were only built after the occupation of Islam, for example in Jerusalem and Ramle. A similar law, prohibiting the build of new synagogues, existed in the Byzantines, and was therefore not new for all Jews. It was new for the Christians.)
 Prohibition against rebuilding destroyed churches, by day or night, in their own neighbourhoods or those situated in the quarters of the Muslims.
 The worship places of non-Muslims must be lower in elevation than the lowest mosque in town.
 The houses of non-Muslims must not be taller in elevation than the houses of Muslims.
 Prohibition against hanging a cross on the Churches.
 Muslims should be allowed to enter Churches (for shelter) in any time, both in day and night.
 Obliging the call of prayer by a bell or a kind of Gong (Nakos) to be low in volume.
 Prohibition of Christians and Jews against raising their voices at prayer times.
 Prohibition against teaching non-Muslim children the Qur'an.
 Christians were forbidden to show their religion in public, or to be seen with Christian books or symbols in public, on the roads or in the markets of the Muslims.
 Palm Sunday and Easter parades were banned.
 Funerals should be conducted quietly.
 Prohibition against burying non-Muslim dead near Muslims.
 Prohibition against raising a pig next to a Muslim neighbour.
 Christians were forbidden to sell Muslims alcoholic beverage.
 Christians were forbidden to provide cover or shelter for spies.
 Prohibition against telling a lie about Muslims.
 Obligation to show deference toward Muslims. If a Muslim wishes to sit, non-Muslim should rise from his seat and let the Muslim sit.
 Prohibition against preaching to Muslims in an attempt to convert them from Islam. 
 Prohibition against preventing the conversion to Islam of some one who wants to convert.
 The appearance of the non-Muslims has to be different from those of the Muslims: Prohibition against wearing Qalansuwa by Christians (kind of dome that was used to wear by Orthodox Muslims), Islamist turban (Amamh), Muslim shoes, and Sash to their waists. As to their heads, it was forbidden to comb the hair sidewise as the Muslim custom, and they were forced to cut the hair in the front of the head. Also non-Muslims shall not imitate the Arab-Muslim way of speech nor shall adopt the kunyas (Arabic byname, such as "abu Khattib").
 Obligation to identify non-Muslims as such by clipping the heads' forelocks and by always dressing in the same manner, wherever they go, with binding the zunnar (a kind of belt) around the waists. Christians to wear blue belts or turbans, Jews to wear yellow belts or turbans, Zoroastrians to wear black belts or turbans, and Samaritans to wear red belts or turbans.
 Prohibition against riding animals in the Muslim custom, and prohibition against riding with a saddle.
 Prohibition against adopting a Muslim title of honour.
 Prohibition against engraving Arabic inscriptions on signet seals.
 Prohibition against any possession of weapons.
 Non-Muslims must host a Muslim passerby for at least 3 days and feed him.
 Non-Muslims prohibited from buying a Muslim prisoner.
 Prohibition against taking slaves who have been allotted to Muslims.
 Prohibition against non-Muslims to lead, govern or employ Muslims.
 If a non-Muslim beats a Muslim, his Dhimmi protection is removed. 
 In return, the ruler would provide security for the Christian believers who follow the rules of the pact.

This pact (or some version of it) would remain in place for centuries, influencing the 1856 Hamayouni Decree which mandated that the Ottoman Sultan must issue permits for any construction or maintenance of churches, and the Coptic Pope had to apply for all such permits, and the 1934 Ten Conditions of Al-Ezabi which remained in place until December 28, 1999. The prohibition against raising the cross was revoked as a result of the martyrdom of Sidhom Bishay.

The most notorious persecutor of the Coptic Christians was Al-Hakim bi-Amr Allah, who decreed that the Christians could no longer celebrate Epiphany or Easter. He also outlawed the use of wine (nabidh) and even other intoxicating drinks not made from grapes (fuqa) to both Muslims and non-Muslims alike, producing hardship for both Christians (who used wine in their religious rites) and Jews (who used it in their religious festivals). In 1005, al-Ḥākim ordered that Jews and Christians follow ghiyār "the law of differentiation" – in this case, the mintaq or zunnar "belt" (Greek ζωνάριον) and 'imāmah "turban", both in black. In addition, Jews must wear a wooden calf necklace and Christians an iron cross. In the public baths, Jews must replace the calf with a bell. In addition, women of the People of the Book had to wear two different coloured shoes, one red and one black. These remained in place until 1014. On 18 October 1009, al-Hakim ordered the destruction of the Holy Sepulchre and its associated buildings, apparently outraged by what he regarded as the fraud practiced by the monks in the "miraculous" Descent of the Holy Fire, celebrated annually at the church during the Easter Vigil. The chronicler Yahia noted that "only those things that were too difficult to demolish were spared." Processions were prohibited, and a few years later all of the convents and churches in Palestine were said to have been destroyed or confiscated. It was only in 1042 that the Byzantine Emperor Constantine IX undertook to reconstruct the Holy Sepulchre with the permission of Al-Hakim's successor. The Coptic language massively declined under the hands of Al-Hakim bi-Amr Allah, who issued strict orders completely prohibiting its anywhere whether in homes, roadways, or schools. Those who didnt comply had their tongues cut off. He even ordered mothers that spoke to their children in Coptic to also have their tongue cut off. He personally walked the streets of Cairo and eavesdropped on Coptic-speaking homes to find out if any family was speaking Coptic.

Caliph Abdul Malek sent his son, Abdullah. to rule over Egypt. It was said He "acted wickedly and created devices with which he tortured people. He was like a wild beast, even finding joy when people were killed in front of him and their blood spattered over his plate of food". At that time, the Patriarch travelled [from Alexandria] to Misr [the old city, next to which Al-Fustat was built] to greet the Wali, as it was customary to do. Upon seeing the Patriarch, Abdullah said, “What is this?” They told him, “This is the Abba and Patriarch of all the Christians.” So, he took the Patriarch and delivered him to one of his janitors and instructed him: “Humiliate him whichever way you desire, until he pays three-thousand dinars.” For three days, the Christians were requesting that he be freed, and great fear came upon the bishops and priests. Deacon Gerga went to the Wali and asked him, “O my Lord, do you seek the Patriarch’s life or money?” So, he said, “I want the money.” So Gerga replied, “Entrust him to me for two months, and I will go around with him asking for money.” Abdullah gave him the Patriarch, and they toured the cities and towns, collecting money from believers in Christ, until they came up with the amount. Additionally, the Wali would assemble bishops, clergy, and monks to mock them arrogantly with hard words, and he would say to them, “To me, you are like the Roum [Byzantines]; whoever kills any of you will be forgiven by Allah, because you are the enemies of Allah.”

Abbasid Caliph Al-Mutawakkil Hated Christians and it is said that:

In the year 1522, local Muslims denounced two Christian brothers in Egypt named Gabriel and Kyrmidoles for blasphemy—“mostly out of jealousy and envy.” So the emir arrested them and “began flattering them and asking questions about their faith.” The brothers made it clear that they were firm adherents of Christianity. “The Muslims in the audience became enraged with the brothers when they heard their answers, and they began screaming and demanding they must become Muslims.” The brothers responded by refusing to “deny the faith we received from our forefathers, but we will remain unshaken and very firm in it until the end.” The Muslim judge deciding their case told the Christian brothers that if they simply embraced Islam, they “would be given many honors and much glory.” Otherwise they would die. At that point, the brothers’ mother came to support them, but “when the Muslims in court noticed her, they fell upon her, tore her clothing, and gave her a thorough beating.” After rebuking the Muslim assailants for their savagery, the brothers reaffirmed that they would never deny Christ for Islam, adding, “behold our necks, do what you wish, but do it quickly.” Then:
 

Despite the political upheaval, Egypt remained mainly Christian, but Copts lost their majority status after the 14th century, as a result of the intermittent persecution and the destruction of the Christian churches there, accompanied by heavy taxes for those who refused to convert. From the Muslim conquest of Egypt onwards, the Coptic Christians were persecuted by different Muslims regimes, such as the Umayyad Caliphate, Abbasid Caliphate, Fatimid Caliphate, Mamluk Sultanate, and Ottoman Empire; the persecution of Coptic Christians included closing and demolishing churches and forced conversion to Islam. They were only made legally equal with Muslims for a short time during Napoleon's rule in Egypt.

Modern era
Edward William Lane, an Arabist who traveled around Egypt in the 1820s disguised as a Muslim, was one of the first modern Europeans to witness the execution of an apostate—in this case, a female convert to Christianity who was exposed by her Coptic cross tattoo. In Lane recounts:

Observers note a large gap between rights for Copts and other minorities that exist under the law and what exists in practice. Critics cite that while in 2016 the parliament worked to pass a bill making it easier for Christians to get government permission to build churches, in practice security officials have stopped actual construction.

In Egypt the government does not officially recognize conversions from Islam to Christianity; also certain interfaith marriages are not allowed either, this prevents marriages between converts to Christianity and those born in Christian communities, and also results in the children of Christian converts being classified as Muslims and given a Muslim education.

The government also requires permits for repairing churches or building new ones, which are often withheld. Article 235 of the 2013 draft constitution requires the next legislative body to create a law that would remove the restrictions on the building of churches. Foreign missionaries are allowed in the country only if they restrict their activities to social improvements and refrain from proselytizing.

Copts complain that disputes between Christians and Muslims are often put before "reconciliation councils", and that these councils invariably favour Muslims. Some Copts complain that the police do not respond when crimes are committed against them. Copts also have little representation in government, leading them to fear there is little hope of progress.

In 1981, President Anwar Sadat, internally exiled the Coptic Pope Shenouda III accusing him of fomenting inter-confessional strife. Sadat then chose five Coptic bishops and asked them to choose a new pope. In 1985 President Hosni Mubarak restored Pope Shenouda III.

The government and other Egyptian sources blame tribal behavior in rural Egypt for much of the violence.

During Mubarak's regime (following that of Anwar Sadat), Copts were still struggling to avoid persecution but there were two appointed Coptic Ministers and one governor, in addition to one Copt (Naguib Sawiris) known as one of the most successful businessmen in the world (and residing in Egypt at the time).  Copts face heightened persecution and marginalization as their churches are systematically attacked.

Complaints by Copts of discrimination in social life also reach the world of sports and the notable absence of Christians in major Egyption sports delegations, namely the national football team. Pope Tawadros remarked in 2018 that "it’s extraordinary that all of Egypt’s football teams don’t have a single Copt who has good legs and who kicked a ball on the streets when he was little". And Muslim former player Ahmed Hossam, known in the footballing world as Mido, stated in an interview that "regrettably, there’s a lot of people in Egypt who are bigoted over colour, religion and ethnicity. We must confront them and not bury our heads in the sand. Can you believe it that in the history of football in Egypt, only five Christians played at the top level?"

Specific incidents

1980s

20 June 1981 – Ten dead in MB Christian clashes in Zawaya Hamra. Five Christians killed and four Muslims killed and one unidentified body.

1990s

9 March 1992 – Manshiet Nasser, Dyroot, Upper Egypt: Copt son of a farmer Badr Abdullah Massoud is gunned down after refusing to pay a tax of about $166 to the local leader of Islamic Group. Massoud's body is then hacked with knives.
4 May 1992 – Villages of Manshia and Weesa in Dyroot, Upper Egypt: After being Manshiet Naser's Christians for weeks, an Islamic extremist methodically shoots 13 of them to death. Victims included ten farmers and a child tending their fields, a doctor leaving his home for work, and an elementary school teacher giving a class.
13 March 1997 – MB mob attacks a Tourist Train with Spanish Tourists, killing 13 Christians and injuring 6, in the Village of Nakhla near Nagge Hammadi.

During this time terrorists increased the frequency of their attacks and widened it to include those whom they viewed as collaborators with the security force, launching an attack on the eve of the Adha Eid using automatic weapons killing Copts as well as Muslims.

1997 – Abu Qurqas: Three masked gunmen entered St. George Church in Abu Qurqas and shot dead eight Copts at a weekly youth group meeting. As the attackers fled, they gunned down a Christian farmer watering his fields.

2000s
January 2000 – 20 Christians killed in riots in the village of Al Kosheh

Al Kosheh is a predominantly Christian Village in southern Egypt. After a Muslim customer and a Christian shoe-store owner fell into an argument, three days of rioting and street fighting erupted leaving 20 Christians (including four children) and one Muslim dead. The killings were not committed in the village of Al Kosheh itself, but in surrounding villages where Muslims are the majority. In the aftermath, 38 Muslim defendants were charged with murder and possession of guns in connection with the deaths of the 20 Copts. But all were acquitted of murder charges, and only four were convicted of any (lesser) charges, with the longest sentence given being 10 years. After protest by the Coptic Pope Shenouda, the government granted a new trial.

February and April 2001 – International Christian Concern reports that in February 2001, armed Muslims burned a church and 35 Christian homes in Egypt. April 2001 a 14-year-old Egyptian Christian girl was kidnapped because her parents were believed to be harboring a convert from Islam to Christianity.
19 April 2009 – A group of Muslims (Mahmoud Hussein Mohamed (26 years old), Mohamed Abdel Kader (32 years old), Ramadan Fawzy Mohamed (24 years old), Ahmed Mohamed Saeed (16 years old), and Abu Bakr Mohamed Saeed) open fire at Christians on Easter's Eve killing two (Hedra Adib (22 years old), and Amir Estafanos (26 years old)) and injuring another (Mina Samir (25 years old)). This event was in Hegaza village, Koos city. On February 22, 2010, they were sentenced to 25 years of jail.

2010
7 January 2010—six Christians killed in attack on Christmas celebration in Nag Hammadi.

Machine gun attack by three MBs from an Arab tribe called Al-Hawara on Coptic Christians celebrating Christmas. Seven are killed (including a Muslim officer who was on service).

A 2010 New Year's Eve attack by Islamic fundamentalists on the Coptic Orthodox Church in the city of Alexandria left 21 dead and many more injured. One week later, thousands of Muslims stood as human shields outside churches as Coptic Christians attended Christmas Masses on 6 and 7 January 2011.

2011
1 January 2011 (On New Year's Eve) – 21 Christians killed in bombing in Alexandria.

A car bomb exploded in front of an Alexandria Coptic Orthodox Church killing at least 21 and injuring at least 79. The incident happened a few minutes after midnight as Christians were leaving a New Year's Eve Church service.

11 January 2011 – A mentally deranged member of the police force opened fire randomly in a train in Samalout station in Minya province resulting in the death of a 71-year-old Coptic Christian man and injuring of 5 others Copts and Muslims.
30 January 2011, just days after the demonstrations to reform the Egyptian government, Muslims in southern Egypt broke into two homes belonging to Coptic Christians. The Muslim assailants murdered 11 people and wounded four others.
5 March 2011 – A church was set on fire in Sole, Egypt by a group of Muslim men angry that a Muslim woman was romantically involved with a Christian man. Large groups of Copts then proceeded to hold major protests stopping traffic for hours in vital areas of Cairo.
April 2011 – After the death of two Muslims on April 18, sectarian violence broke out in the southern Egyptian town of Abu Qurqas El Balad, in Minya Governorate, 260 km south of Cairo. One Christian Copt was killed. Coptic homes, shops, businesses, fields and livestock were plundered and torched.
7 May 2011 – the burning of 3 Coptic Orthodox churches, and the destruction of many Christian-owned houses and businesses. In addition, 15 people were killed in the attacks, and about 232 injured.
A dispute started over claims that several women who converted to Islam had been abducted by the church and was being held against her will in St. Mary Church of Imbaba, Giza, ended in violent clashes that left 15 dead, among whom were Muslims and Christians, and roughly 55 injured. Eyewitnesses confirmed the church was burnt by Muslims who are not from the neighborhood, by the committee of the National Council for Human Rights (NCHR). Copts converting to Islam are usually advised by the police to take out restraining orders against their families as the Coptic community does not tolerate converts to Islam. These incidents have fueled strife and problems between Copts and Muslims as in the famous case of Camelia.

18 May 2011 – The Coptic Church obtained a permission in January to turn a garment factory bought by the church in 2006, into a church in the neighbourhood of Ain Shams of Cairo. However, angry Muslim mobs attacked the church and scores of Copts and Muslims were arrested for the disturbance. On Sunday May 29, an Egyptian Military Court sentenced two Coptic Christians to five years in jail each for violence and for trying to turn a factory into an unlicensed church.

The events came against the backdrop of tensions simmering due to the violent military breakup of a sit-in staged at Maspiro by Coptic demonstrators a few days earlier to protest the burning of the church of Marinab in the Governorate of Aswan by Muslims of the region.

2012
18 September 2012 – A Coptic Christian schoolteacher was sentenced to jail for six years because he posted cartoons on Facebook which were allegedly defamatory to Islam and Mohammed, and also insulted Egyptian President Mohamed Morsi. Al-Jamaa Al-Islamiya members and Salafist groups attempted to attack Kamel as he was led out of court, and rocks were thrown at the police car used to take him away from the court.  However, the schoolteacher denied posting the cartoons and said that his account was hacked.

2013

According to The Guardian,  four Christians and one Muslim were killed in sectarian clashes that broke out north of Cairo after children allegedly drew a swastika on Islamic property. On Sunday Christians gathered in Cairo to remember the dead in a service that ended by further escalating sectarian tensions resulting in two Christians and one Muslim being killed. Local news reports that the sixth Coptic victim who has died was set on fire during the clashes died in hospital a few days later, while according to other media sources the second Muslim victim died from a fractured skull. Doctors and Interior Ministry officials said bullet wounds accounted for most of the deaths, including that of Mina Daniel, a young political activist a doctor said had been shot in the shoulder and leg.

Christians complained  revolution, and the first time the Cathedral had been attacked.

July 2013 – Muslim Brotherhood supporters burn dozens of churches.
Following the July 3 coup d'état against President Mohamed Morsi – a member of the Islamist Muslim Brotherhood – Muslim Brotherhood supporters burn dozens of churches throughout Egypt and killed at least 45 Coptic Christians.

2014
In March 2014, Mary Sameh George, a 25-year-old Coptic Christian woman, was killed by a group of Muslims who are affiliated with the Muslim Brotherhood. An eyewitness told the Egyptian TV show 90 Minutes that "once they saw that she was a Christian because of a cross hanging on her rear view mirror, they jumped on top of the car. They pulled her out of the car and started pounding on her and pulling her hair. They beat and stripped her, stabbed her in the back and slit her throat."
In December 2014, A Coptic doctor named Magdy Sobhi and his wife were killed by Ansar al-Sharia in Libya. They kidnapped his eldest daughter Catherine, who was later found dead in a desert. The motivation for the killing was found to be religious and not criminal because local police found money in the doctor's apartment untouched.

2015
On 15 February 2015, militants in Libya claiming loyalty to ISIL released a video depicting the beheading of 21 Coptic Christians. Subsequently, the victims were commemorated as martyr saints on the 8th Amshir of the Coptic calendar, which is February 15 of the Gregorian calendar.

2016
 February 2016 – three Christian teenagers in Minya are sentenced to five years in prison for insulting Islam.  They had appeared in a video, allegedly mocking Muslim prayers, but claimed they had been mocking IS following a number of beheadings by that group.
26 May – a 70-year-old Christian woman in Minya is beaten and dragged through the streets naked by a mob who falsely suspected her son of having a sexual relationship with a Muslim woman.
 On 11 December 2016, the Botroseya Church bombing killed 29 people and injured 47 others.

2017
February 2017 – terrorist groups fighting in the Sinai insurgency call for attacks on Christians. At least seven Christians are killed in separate attacks in city of El Arish in Sinai. Many Coptic families respond by fleeing from the Sinai Peninsula  to Ismailia Governorate. 
9 April 2017 – Bombings of two Coptic churches kill over 45 people and injures over 130. St George's Coptic Orthodox Church in the Tanta region and St Mark's Church in Alexandria were bombed during Palm Sunday processions.
 7 May 2017 – A Christian man was shot dead by Islamic State militants in El Arish.
26 May – 2017 Minya attack, In May 2017, gunmen executed at least 28 Christian pilgrims traveling in a bus to the monastery of St. Samuel the Confessor in Minya Governorate.
12 October – A Coptic priest was killed in a knife attack in Cairo; his murderer subsequently declared his antipathy toward Christians.
29 December – A gunman who was later identified as an Islamic extremist shot multiple people at Saint Menas church in Helwan killing 11 people including a police officer.

2018
 1 January – Two Coptic Christian brothers were killed by masked gunmen for being inside an alcohol store in Al Omraneyah, Giza. According to eyewitnesses, the masked man shouted during the shooting "these are Christians" 
 15  January – A Coptic man was killed in El Arish. Two armed Muslim men stopped Bassem and asked him about his religion. After answering that he was Christian, they shot him in the head.
 2 November – At least seven killed and seven wounded when Bedouins loyal to ISIL opened fire on a bus-load of Coptic pilgrims travelling between Cairo and Minya on its way to a monastery.
 12 December – A Coptic man and his son were killed in Minya Governorate by a police officer responsible for guarding the church after fabricating a quarrel with them.

2020
 5 October – A Muslim mob in the village of Dabbous near Samalut attacked Coptic people, homes and property after two Muslim adults bullied and beat up a 10-year-old Coptic child, causing retaliation from Coptic adults. The police later arrested six Muslims and six Christians.

2021
 18 April – A Coptic man in Bir al-Abd was held captive for five months by ISIS in the Sinai Peninsula, then killed on camera. In the video, he stated that he helped build the Church of Virgin Mary in Bir El-Abd, and that it is helping the army and intelligence services fight ISIS.
 27 May – A Coptic monk is executed for murder of the abbot of his monastery over authority and control disputes, the accused monk within the monastery was forced to confess. UN experts sent a letter to the Egyptian authorities expressing concerns about the allegations of torture of him and his co-defendant.

Abduction and forced conversion of Coptic women
Coptic women and girls are abducted, forced to convert to Islam and marry Muslim men. In 2009 the Washington, D.C.-based group Christian Solidarity International published a study of the abductions and forced marriages and the anguish felt by the young women because returning to Christianity is against the law. Further allegations of organised abduction of Copts, trafficking and police collusion continue in 2017.

In April 2010, a bipartisan group of 17 members of the U.S. Congress expressed concern to the State Department's Trafficking in Persons Office about Coptic women who faced "physical and sexual violence, captivity ... exploitation in forced domestic servitude or commercial sexual exploitation, and financial benefit to the individuals who secure the forced conversion of the victim."

According to the Egyptian NGO Association of Victims of Abduction and Forced Disappearance, between 2011 and March 2014, around 550 Coptic girls have been kidnapped, and forced to convert to Islam. According the same survey around 40% of the girls were raped prior to their conversion to Islam and married their captors.

Post-revolution anti-women radical trend afflicting Copts

The synchronization of fatwas by Abu Islam's and fatwas by other scholars which categorize certain groups of women (basically Coptic women) as women who are 'asking for it' just because they are not in the radical boat, or because they oppose the regime, have been seen as unacceptable and degrading to Egyptian women in general, to independent women (widows and divorcees) in particular, and more specifically, to the Coptic women who were categorized as Crusaders, sharameet (prostitutes), women who were lewd and therefore willing to be raped. Salma Almasrya, an Egyptian Activist said that what the scholar has claimed comes in harmony with the official declaration from state men which blamed the female activists for the rape crimes which they were subjected to, then comes the  un-deterred harassment on the part of the Ministry of Media for two media female interviewers in two different situations calling one (hot) on air while asking the other to (come and I will show you where!) when she asked about the freedom of expression, a phrase that was considered very offensive by the media causing many activists to believe that there was a state-orchestrated campaign of terrorism against female activists by humiliation and intimidation rather than force which has been condemned by many media people around the country.

See also
 Christianity in Egypt
 Human rights in Egypt#Freedom of religion
 Human rights in the Middle East
 Human rights in Muslim-majority countries
 Persecution of Christians#Egypt
 Religion in Egypt#Freedom of religion and human rights
 Christianity and Islam
 Controversies related to Islam and Muslims
 List of modern conflicts in the Middle East
 Anti-Oriental Orthodox sentiment

Notes

References

Bibliography
 
 
  - Print  Online

External links
 European Centre for Law and Justice (2011): The Persecution of Oriental Christians, what answer from Europe?

 
Anti-Christian sentiment
Coptic history
Persecution of Christians
History of Oriental Orthodoxy
Human rights abuses in Egypt
Persecution of Christians by Muslims
Islamist attacks on churches
Islamic terrorism